The Pettigarths Field Cairns is a Neolithic site in the parish of Nesting, northeastern Whalsay, in the Shetland islands of Scotland. The site contains upright stones as well as masonry.

The first archaeological explorations were carried out in 1936 and 1938. They were then inferred to be tombs belonging to the Late Stone Age and Early Bronze Age. It was excavated in 1963 by C. S. T. Calder and visited by OS (NKB) on 30 May 1968.

Layout
The large cairn has a paved chamber and passage. The chamber is small and is heel-shaped; it is different in layout from three other cairns found in Shetland. The passage into the cairn is through two standing boulders. It is an expanding passage where stones are seen at its inner end. Parts of the jambs are described as the "terminal and lateral recesses of the trefoil." Some remnants of pottery were found here which could not be identified because of the fragmentary nature.  

The smaller, circular cairn was excavated up to its foundations. A slab covering was found in the cavity as grave robbers appeared to have tried robbing the tomb's interior. The cist has a rubble stone lining, partly surviving.

References

Neolithic Scotland
Archaeological sites in Shetland
Chambered cairns
Whalsay